Liu Guozhen (born 16 January 1957) is a Chinese fencer. He competed in the individual and team sabre events at the 1984 Summer Olympics.

References

External links
 

1957 births
Living people
Chinese male sabre fencers
Olympic fencers of China
Fencers at the 1984 Summer Olympics